The 1936 Kentucky Derby was the 62nd running of the Kentucky Derby. The race took place on May 2, 1936.

Full results

 Winning breeder: Morton L. Schwartz (KY)

References

1936
Kentucky Derby
Derby